Gunnlǫð (also Gunnlöd) is a jötunn in Norse mythology. She is the daughter of Suttungr, for whom she guards the mead of poetry.
Saturn's moon Gunnlod is named after her. She may be the skaldic god Bragi's mother.

Name 
The Old Norse name  has been translated as 'war-invitation', or 'battle-invitation'. It stems from Old Norse  ('battle').

Attestations 
Skáldskaparmál (The Language of Poetry) mentions that the jötunn Suttungr has entrusted his daughter Gunnlöð to the guard of the mead of poetry:

But Odin, in the form of a snake, manages to gain access to the chamber within the Hnitbjörg mountain where the mead is kept. The god seduces the guardian Gunnlöð, and sleeps with her three nights. In return, Gunnlöð allows Odin to obtain three drinks of the mead, after which he immediately flies himself out of the cavern as an eagle.
In Hávamál (Sayings of the High One), the account given by Odin differs in a number of details, and the narrative pays most attention to Gunnlöð herself.

References

Bibliography 

 

Gýgjar